"Sunshine Playroom" is a song by the English singer-songwriter Julian Cope. It is his debut single released in support of his first solo album World Shut Your Mouth.

Formats and track listing 
All songs written by Julian Cope.
UK 7" single (COPE 1)
"Sunshine Playroom" – 2:55
"High Class Butcher" – 3:56

UK 12" single (COPE 112)
"Sunshine Playroom" – 2:55
"Wreck My Car" – 2:31
"High Class Butcher" – 3:56
"Eat the Poor" – 4:25

Chart positions

References

External links 
 

1983 songs
1983 debut singles
Julian Cope songs
Mercury Records singles
Songs written by Julian Cope